The 32d Flying Training Squadron was last part of the 71st Flying Training Wing based at Vance Air Force Base, Oklahoma. It operated Beechcraft T-1 Jayhawk aircraft conducting flight training. It was inactivated on 14 September 2012.

History

World War II

Activated in late 1942 under I Troop Carrier Command and equipped with C-47 Skytrains. Trained in various parts of the eastern United States until the end of 1943. Deployed to French Morocco in May 1943 and assigned to Twelfth Air Force to support combat operations in the North African Campaign. Remained with Twelfth Air Force, moving to Tunisia and Sicily providing transport and resupply operations as well as casualty evacuation of wounded personnel in the Mediterranean Theater of Operations. Reassigned to IX Troop Carrier Command, in England during early 1944 as part of the build-up of Allied forces prior to the D-Day invasion of France.

Began operations by dropping paratroops into Normandy on D-Day (6 June 1944) and releasing gliders with reinforcements on the following day. The unit received a Distinguished Unit Citation for these missions.

After the Normandy invasion the squadron ferried supplies in the United Kingdom. The squadron also hauled food, clothing, medicine, gasoline, ordnance equipment, and other supplies to the front lines and evacuated patients to rear zone hospitals. It dropped paratroops near Nijmegen and towed gliders carrying reinforcements during the Operation Market Garden, the airborne attack on the Netherlands. In December, it participated in the Battle of the Bulge by releasing gliders with supplies for the 101st Airborne Division near Bastogne.

Moved to Belgium in early 1945, and participated in the Western Allied invasion of Germany, participating in the air assault across the Rhine River in March 1945, each aircraft towed two gliders with troops of the 17th Airborne Division and released them near Wesel.

After V-E Day, became part of the United States Air Forces in Europe, being assigned to AAF Station Frankfurt and was part of the USAFE European Air Transport System, supporting the occupation forces in Germany as well as carrying supplies and personnel between various stations in Western Europe. Inactivated on 30 September 1946 in Germany.

Airlift operations
The squadron was redesignated the 32d Tactical Airlift Squadron and conducted worldwide airlift operations between 1973 and 1979.

Pilot training
The squadron became the 32d Flying Training Squadron and provided pilot training from 1995–2012. Due to a lack of a relevant mission for a lesser known sister squadron, the 32d was inactivated in an attempt to save the heritage of the 3rd Fighter Training Squadron. The 32d was inactivated on 14 Sep 2012.

Campaigns and decorations
 Campaigns. World War II: Sicily; Naples-Foggia; Rome-Arno; Normandy; Northern France; Rhineland; Central Europe.
 Decorations. Distinguished Unit Citations: Sicily, 11 Jul 1943; France, [6-7] Jun 1944. Air Force Outstanding Unit Awards: 1 Jul 1995-30 Jun 1996; 1 Jul 1996-30 Jun 1997; 1 Jul 1997-30 Jun 1998; 1 Jul 1998-30 Jun 1999; 1 Jul 1999-30 Jun 2000; 1 Jul 2000-30 Jun 2001; 1 Jul 2001-30 Jun 2002; 1 Jul 2001-30 Jun 2003; 1 Jul 2003-30 Jun 2004; 1 Jul 2004-30 Jun 2005.

Lineage
 Constituted as the 32d Transport Squadron on 28 January 1942
 Activated on 2 March 1942
 Redesignated 32d Troop Carrier Squadron on 4 July 1942
 Inactivated on 30 September 1946
 Redesignated 32d Tactical Airlift Squadron on 18 June 1973
 Activated on 1 September 1973
 Inactivated on 30 June 1979
 Redesignated 32d Airlift Flight on 1 May 1993
 Activated on 31 May 1993
 Inactivated on 1 October 1993
 Redesignated 32d Flying Training Squadron on 3 March 1995
 Activated on 1 June 1995
 Inactivated on 14 September 2012

Assignments
 314th Transport Group, 2 March 1942
 50th Transport Wing, 31 March 1942
 314th Troop Carrier Group, 19 August 1942 (attached to 441st Troop Carrier Group after September 1945)
 441st Troop Carrier Group, December 1945 – 30 September 1946
 314th Tactical Airlift Wing, 1 Sep 1973 (attached to 513th Tactical Airlift Wing, 5 November 1973 – 16 January 1974, 3 September–14 November 1975; 322d Tactical Airlift Wing, 3 February–16 April 1975; 435th Combat Support Group, 3 June–14 August 1976, 13 February–13 April 1977; 435th Tactical Airlift Group, 9 September–14 November 1977)
 314th Tactical Airlift Group, 1 November 1978 – 30 June 1979 (attached to 313th Tactical Airlift Group, 17 February–14 April 1979)
 46th Test Wing, 31 May–1 October 1993
 71st Operations Group, 1 June 1995 – 14 September 2012

Stations

 Drew Field, Florida, 2 March 1942
 Bowman Field, Kentucky, 24 June 1942
 Army Air Base, Knob Noster, Missouri, 4 November 1942
 Lawson Field, Georgia, 22 February–4 May 1943
 Berguent Airfield, French Morocco, May 1943
 Kairouan Airfield, Tunisia, 26 June 1943
 Castelvetrano Airfield, Sicily, Italy, 1 September 1943 – 13 February 1944
 RAF Saltby (AAF-538), England, 20 February 1944
 Poix Airfield (B-44), France, 28 February 1945

 AAF Station Frankfurt, Germany, 23 September 1945 – 30 September 1946
 Little Rock Air Force Base, Arkansas, 1 September 1973 – 30 June 1979 (Deployed to RAF Mildenhall, England, 5 November 1973 – 16 January 1974, 3 September–14 November 1975, 9 September–14 November 1977, 17 February–14 Apr 1979; Rhein-Main Air Base, Germany, 3 February–16 April 1975, 3 June–14 August 1976, 13 February–13 April 1977)
 Eglin Air Force Base, Florida, 31 May–1 October 1993
 Vance Air Force Base, Oklahoma, 1 June 1995 – 14 September 2012

Aircraft
 Douglas C-47 Skytrain (1942–1946)
 Lockheed C-130 Hercules (1973–1979)
 Beechcraft T-1 Jayhawk (1995–2012)

See also

References

Notes
 Explanatory notes

 Citations

Bibliography

 
 
 
 
 

032
0032